Schubert Dip is the debut album by British rock band EMF, released on Parlophone Records on 7 May 1991. It features the worldwide hit single "Unbelievable" which reached number one on the US Billboard Hot 100. The name of the album is a pun on the name of the popular sweet sherbet dip and the 19th-century composer Franz Schubert.

Critical reception 

Alex Henderson of AllMusic gave the album three stars out of five, feeling that overall it was not as good as the standout single "Unbelievable": "The only song that comes close to packing the punch of 'Unbelievable' is the intoxicating 'Long Summer Days'. For the most part, Schubert Dip is a prime example of an album that is simply decent when it should have been excellent."

Track listing 
All songs written and composed by James Atkin, Derry Brownson, Mark Decloedt, Ian Dench & Zac Foley, except where noted.

 "Children" – 5:15
 "Long Summer Days" – 4:00
 "When You're Mine" (Dench) – 3:22
 "Travelling Not Running" (Dench) – 4:20
 "I Believe" – 3:43
 "Unbelievable" – 3:29
 "Girl of an Age" – 3:56
 "Admit It" (Dench) – 3:28
 "Lies" (Dench) – 4:27 (4:19 on reissue)
 "Longtime" – 4:25 (original length was 8:10, as it included "EMF" as a hidden track)
 "EMF" (Live at the Bilson) – 3:54 (hidden track on the original, later listed separately on reissue)

Note
The track "Lies" on the first pressings of Schubert Dip originally began with a sample of the voice of John Lennon's assassin, Mark David Chapman, reciting the first two lines of the lyrics to Lennon's "Watching the Wheels". Lennon's widow, Yoko Ono, objected to this sample and as a result all subsequent pressings of the album have omitted the sample of Chapman's voice.
The Hungarian speech at the beginning of the track "Travelling Not Running": "" ("It is impossible to harm the oppositionist, the final result will decide it".) The person was János Berecz, a Hungarian Communist Party ("Hungarian Socialist Labour Party") politician at the end of the Iron Curtain era.

Sample credits
"Unbelievable" includes samples of US comedian Andrew Dice Clay throughout the track.
The song "Girl of an Age" contains a sample of the character Ernie from Sesame Street speaking to his friend Bert.
The song "Longtime" contains a sample of a reading of The Hollow Men by T. S. Eliot.

Personnel 
EMF
James Atkin – vocals, guitars
Derry Brownson – keyboards, samples
Mark Decloedt – drums
Ian Dench – keyboards and guitars
Zac Foley – bass

Additional personnel
DJ Milf – turntables, scratching 
Claudia Fontaine – backing vocals on "Children", "I Believe", "Girl of an Age" & "Lies"
Sindy Finn & Laurane McIntosh – backing vocals on "Travelling Not Running"
Mastering by George Marino at Sterling Sound, NYC

Charts

Weekly charts

Year-end charts

References 

EMF (band) albums
1991 debut albums
Capitol Records albums
Parlophone albums